Warid was a GSM based mobile network operator in Bangladesh. It entered into Bangladeshi telecommunication industry as the sixth mobile carrier. It commenced commercial operations on May 10, 2007.

Warid Telecom, a wholly owned subsidiary of the Abu Dhabi Group, offered mobile telephony service with a subscriber base of over 2.9 million in Bangladesh.

History
In December 2005, Warid Telecom International LLC, an Abu Dhabi based consortium paid US$50 million to obtain a GSM license from the BTRC and became the sixth mobile phone operator in Bangladesh.

In a press conference on August 17, 2006, Warid announced that its network would be activated two months ahead of schedule, in October 2006. In October 2006, Warid Telecom put off the launch of its cellphone services in Bangladesh until April 2007 after its major supplier Nokia walked out on an agreement over a payment dispute.

Warid had a soft launch at the end of January 2007. It gave away complimentary subscriptions among a selected group of individuals to make test calls and the operator adjusted its network's quality based on their comments.

On April 14, 2007, that marked Pohela Boishakh Warid Bangladesh kicked off its advertisement campaign titled Salam Bangladesh Salam. A few days later on the April 29, the official website was launched.

On May 9, 2007, Warid in an advertisement in major daily newspapers stated that it would be launching commercially on May 10, 2007.  However, tariff details were not revealed.  The advertisement included an announcement for the people interested in buying Warid connections to bring documents such as ID Card to the designated franchise and customer care centres.

Within 70 days, the company crossed the 1 million customers mark on July 19, 2007. It was achieved ten days earlier as compared to Warid Pakistan, the subsidiary of Warid Telecom in Pakistan.

On October 1, 2007, Warid Telecom expanded its network to five more districts raising a total number of districts under Warid coverage to 56, said a press release. Mymensingh, Jamalpur, Sherpur, Rajbari and Narail districts were covered by Warid network.

On November 10, 2007, 61 districts were covered by Warid.

On June 10, 2008, Warid Telecom expanded its network to 3 more districts Bandarban, Khagrachhari and Rangamati. With this, all 64 districts of Bangladesh were under Warid network coverage. Warid thus became a pan Bangladeshi mobile network.

Network
Warid invested US$1 billion in setting up its network across the nation. The network deployed in Bangladesh by Warid was based on the next generation mobile technology. Ericsson was selected as the vendor for its network base stations, microwave links, IT support and transmission towers.

Radio frequency

Number scheming
Warid used the following numbering scheme:

+8801641667962

Where 880 is the ISD code for Bangladesh and is required when dialling outside the country, 16 was the prefix for Warid allocated by the government of Bangladesh. Omitting +880 would require 0 instead to represent local call, hence 016 was the general prefix and N1N2N3N4N5N6N7N8 is the subscriber number.

Marketing

Warid presented prepaid and postpaid plans branded as zem and zahi. Derived from an Arabic word meaning fun, zem caters the needs of pay-as-you-go customers. Likewise, zahi means royal and is an array of postpaid tariff plans.

Warid had ten business centres around the country located at key locations. These centers were controlled and operated by Warid.
It had another 120 franchises across Bangladesh, which was further backed up by a chain of sub-franchises, affinity partners & distributors.

Acquisition
In 2010, Warid Telecom sold a majority 70% stake in the company to India's Bharti Airtel Limited for US$300 million. The Bangladesh Telecommunication Regulatory Commission approved the deal on Jan 4, 2010.

Bharti Airtel Limited took management control of the company and its board, and rebranded the company's services under its own Airtel brand on December 20, 2010.

In March 2013, Warid Telecom sold its remaining 30% shares to Bharti Airtel's Singapore-based concern Bharti Airtel Holdings Pte Limited.

See also
 List of mobile network operators in Bangladesh

References

Warid Telecom
Mobile phone companies of Bangladesh
2010 mergers and acquisitions
Bangladeshi subsidiaries of foreign companies